A Sense of Place was a Canadian television series which aired on CBC Television in 1966.

Premise
The series, hosted by University of Toronto professor James Acland, examined modern Canadian architecture for selected Canadian projects that were built in the mid-1960s. Episodes included commentary by the architects involved in their respective projects.

Acland previously discussed architectural subjects in CBC documentaries such as Man in a Landscape during the 1960s.

Episodes
 4 October 1966: Introduction and preview of the following episodes
 11 October 1966: Simon Fraser University, designed by a Vancouver firm headed by Arthur Erickson and Geoffrey Massey
 18 October 1966: Scarborough College (University of Toronto), by John Andrews
 25 October 1966: Habitat 67, by Moshe Safdie

Scheduling
The series aired at 10:30 p.m. on Thursdays from 4 to 25 October 1966.

References

CBC Television original programming
1966 Canadian television series debuts
1966 Canadian television series endings
Architecture in Canada
Documentary television series about architecture